Cumsingmoon or Jinxingmen is an anchorage in Zhuhai, Guangdong, on the southern coast of China, within the Pearl River estuary and close to the former European colonies of Macao and Hong Kong.

In the early years of British Hong Kong in the 1840s, Cumsingmoon, together with Nan'ao, was home to an informal "counter-colony" jointly managed by opium merchants and local Chinese officials, helping traders to evade the colonial administration. In 1845, this settlement comprised a self-governing community of 5,000 Chinese and European traders.

El Piñal, a port granted to Spain by the Ming dynasty in 1598–1600, has speculatively been identified with Cumsingmoon.

References

Further reading

Geography of Zhuhai
Ports and harbours of China